Nandhavana Theru is a 1995 Indian Tamil-language drama film, directed by R. V. Udayakumar and produced by T. Siva and A. Selvaraj. The film stars Karthik and newcomer Srinidhi. It was released on 11 May 1995. The film did not do well at the box office.

Plot 

Srinivasan "Seenu" is an orphan and a full-time thief. He helps prisoners by solving their problems outside the prison. One day, he is intrigued by a prisoner's silence. Seenu asks him about his problem. The prisoner is Adhiseshan, the maternal uncle of Gayatri, a singer. He is a very rich man. He has been wrongfully convicted and sent to prison by Gayatri's paternal uncle Rajashekar and his son Gunasekaran. The duo have also managed poison Gayatri's mind against Adisheshan.

Adisheshan believes that Gayatri's life is great danger from the duo and requests Seenu to make her see the truth and save her. Seenu promises him that he will solve his problem. Initially, Gayatri avoids Seenu but she soon understands the true nature of Rajasekhar and she becomes Seenu's friend. Adhiseshan then realises that Seenu is his son (soon after looking at a photo of Seenu's mother). Seenu is thrilled about this as well and brings Gayatri to Adhiseshan's house to help them reunite. To their shock they find Adhiseshan dead.

It is then revealed that Rajashekar and Gunasekaran have borrowed a lot of money and defaulted. They are sent to jail for this. This also means that Gayathri has to leave her house. Seenu happily accommodates her in his house. Seenu then decides to mend his ways, give up thievery and earn money in the right way to help Gayatri realise her dream: to become a Carnatic music singer. He succeeds and she becomes a famous singer. She builds is also able to buy herself a new house. She then reveals to Seenu that she's in love with Suresh, a fan of hers. Suresh's father is not happy about his son intending to marrying Gayatri. He helps Rajasekhar get out of prison and gets him try and separate the couple before their marriage. Seenu manages to save them and the couple elope. In the end, Seenu marries a widow in order to keep a promise to his neighbour. Seenu takes care of the widow and her son.

Cast 
Karthik as Srinivasan "Seenu"
Srinidhi as Gayatri
Anandaraj as Rajasekhar
Devan as Adhiseshan
Janagaraj as Albert
Vivek as Beedi
Vadivelu as Theekuchi
Manorama as Seenu's neighbour
LIC Narasimhan as Church Father
Gayathri as Seenu's neighbour
Siva as Suresh (Guest appearance)
Madhan Bob as a Music instrument seller (Guest appearance)

Soundtrack 

The soundtrack was composed by Ilaiyaraaja, with lyrics by R. V. Udayakumar.

Release and reception 
Nandhavana Theru was released on 11 May 1995. K. Vijiyan of New Straits Times wrote, "Uthayakumar takes the movie nicely to just the interval. From then on, the story loses steam and we wonder where it is heading". Chrompettai Kavirayar of Kalki wrote there are around 300 films revolving around love triangle, this one too joins the list and concluded there are others to beat around the bush, but questioned Udayakumar needs to do this. The film did not do well at the box office.

References

External links 

1990s Tamil-language films
1995 films
Films directed by R. V. Udayakumar
Films scored by Ilaiyaraaja
Indian drama films